Rhytiphora rugicollis is a species of beetle in the family Cerambycidae, and the type species of its genus. It was described by Dalman in 1817, originally under the genus Lamia. It is known from Australia.

References

rugicollis
Beetles described in 1817